Labullinyphia is a genus of Asian dwarf spiders containing the species Labullinyphia furcata and Labullinyphia tersa. It was first described by P. J. van Helsdingen in 1985,. The former species is found in China and the latter species in Sri Lanka.

See also
 List of Linyphiidae species (I–P)

References

Invertebrates of Sri Lanka
Linyphiidae
Araneomorphae genera
Spiders of Asia